Destroyer is a 2018 American neo-noir crime drama film directed by Karyn Kusama, written and co-produced by Phil Hay and Matt Manfredi, and starring Nicole Kidman with Toby Kebbell, Tatiana Maslany, Scoot McNairy, Bradley Whitford, and Sebastian Stan. The film follows a former undercover police officer (Kidman), who takes revenge against members of a gang, years after her case was blown.

The film had its world premiere at the Telluride Film Festival on August 31, 2018, and was released in the United States on December 25, 2018, by Annapurna Pictures. It received generally positive response from critics, who mainly praised Kidman's performance, but was a box-office disappointment, grossing $5.6 million on a $9–12.4 million budget. At the 76th Golden Globe Awards, Kidman was nominated for Best Actress in a Motion Picture - Drama.

Plot
LAPD detective Erin Bell arrives on the scene of a John Doe murder and informs the responding officers that she knows the identity of the murderer.

At the police station, Erin receives a $100 bill stained from a dye pack in an unmarked envelope. Using a contact at the FBI, she confirms that the bill is from a bank robbery committed by a California gang 16 years prior that her former partner, FBI agent Chris, and she were embedded in as undercover officers. She tells her superiors that she believes the bill to be proof that the gang's leader, Silas, is once again active.

Erin works her way through the remaining members of the gang to find Silas. She begins with Toby, who was in prison, but is now gravely ill and living with his mother on compassionate release. She gives him a handjob in exchange for the location of Arturo, a member of the gang atoning for his past crimes by offering pro bono legal services to immigrants. Arturo provides Erin with the location of Dennis DiFranco, a lawyer who launders the multimillion-dollar haul from the original robbery and from whom Erin deduces that Silas is active again because the money from that heist is almost gone. After Erin thrashes him, DiFranco gives her the location of the next money drop, which is performed by Silas' girlfriend Petra, who has developed a severe drug addiction. Erin tracks Petra, eventually intervening in a bank robbery committed by Silas' new gang.  Petra and she brutally injure each other in a fight, ending with Erin abducting Petra.

Flashbacks reveal that Erin and Chris developed a romantic relationship while undercover, with Erin eventually becoming pregnant, later having their daughter, Shelby. At Erin's behest, they decided to become legitimate participants in a bank robbery and planned to take their shares of the heist, report to their superiors that they lost contact with the gang, and eventually quit the force. The robbery was botched when a dye pack exploded in one of the bags, and Silas killed the bank teller who accidentally placed it. When Chris attempted to intervene, he was shot and killed by Silas. After crashing the van against a dumpster and seriously injuring Toby, Erin hid her share of the heist and returned to policing, disclosing neither her original plan nor her share of the heist.

In the present, Erin visits Ethan, Shelby's adoptive father, and later talks with Shelby. Erin visits a self storage unit to retrieve her $300,000+ share of the stolen money, but finds that all but $11,000 is stained with dye. Silas sends a text message to Petra's phone, instructing her to meet him at the Bowtie Park, where Erin confronts and shoots him, avenging Chris. She returns the next morning to find the police investigating the crime scene, the John Doe murder investigation depicted in the first scene of the film. With Silas dead, Erin gives evidence of her guiltwhere he can find Petra, a stained bill, and the key to her storage unitto her partner, Antonio. Erin has been bleeding internally for hours, from injuries she sustained during a beating by DiFranco's bodyguard and in her fight with Petra, and she dies while sitting in her car.

Cast

Production
In August 2017, Nicole Kidman entered into talks to star in the film with Karyn Kusama directing, with the casting confirmed in October. Rocket Science helped arrange the financing and is representing international sales. In November, Tatiana Maslany, Sebastian Stan, Bradley Whitford, Toby Kebbell, and Scoot McNairy were added to the cast, and filming commenced in Los Angeles in early December, with the rest of the cast filled out with the additions of Beau Knapp, Jade Pettyjohn, Toby Huss, Zach Villa, and James Jordan.

Release
In May 2018, Annapurna Pictures acquired distribution rights to the film. It had its world premiere at the Telluride Film Festival on August 31, 2018. It was also screened at the 2018 Toronto International Film Festival, in the Platform program. It was also screened at AFI Fest on November 13, 2018. It was released on December 25, 2018.

Reception

Box office
Destroyer made $1.5 million in the United States, and $4 million in other territories, for a worldwide total of $5.5 million.

The film made $58,572 from three theaters in its opening weekend, a six-day total of $115,661.

Critical response
The website's critical consensus reads, "Destroyers grueling narrative is as uncompromising as Nicole Kidman's central performance, which adds extra layers to a challenging film that leaves a lingering impact." On Metacritic, the film has a weighted average score of 62 out of 100, based on 44 critics, indicating "generally favorable reviews".

Peter Debruge of Variety and Brooke Marine of W both found Kidman "unrecognizable" in the role and Debruge added, "she disappears into an entirely new skin, rearranging her insides to fit the character's tough hide", whereas Marine highlighted Kidman's method acting.

Accolades

References

26. ^ Jacob Krueger Podcast
Destroyer: How To Use Flashbacks In Your Script

External links
 
 
 
 

2018 films
2018 crime drama films
2010s gang films
2010s police films
2010s English-language films
American films about revenge
American crime drama films
American gang films
Hood films
American neo-noir films
American nonlinear narrative films
American police detective films
Annapurna Pictures films
Fictional portrayals of the Los Angeles Police Department
Films about bank robbery
Films directed by Karyn Kusama
Films produced by Phil Hay (screenwriter)
Films produced by Matt Manfredi
Films scored by Theodore Shapiro
Films set in Los Angeles
Films shot in Los Angeles
Films with screenplays by Phil Hay (screenwriter)
Films with screenplays by Matt Manfredi
2010s American films